Radojica Vasić (born 25 January 1976) is a Serbian football coach and a former defensive midfielder. he is an assistant coach with Mladost Lučani. He spent most of his career playing for his hometown club Mladost Lučani.

Honours
Mladost Lučani
 Serbian First League: 2006–07, 2013–14

External links
 
 

1976 births
Living people
People from Lučani
Association football midfielders
Serbia and Montenegro footballers
Serbian footballers
Serbia and Montenegro expatriate footballers
Expatriate footballers in Russia
Expatriate footballers in Belarus
Russian Premier League players
Serbian SuperLiga players
FK Mladost Lučani players
FK Vojvodina players
FC Elista players
FC Slavia Mozyr players
FK Javor Ivanjica players
FK Smederevo players
FK Metalac Gornji Milanovac players